Warren Smith is a Rugby League commentator for Fox Sports Australia.

Smith has been with the pay TV network since 1995 and has gained a reputation for his distinctive style and versatility. Smith has made the term "they're gonna say" his own (they're gonna say it's a knock on, they're gonna say the pass was forward). He's also known for being inexplicably incredulous for no apparent reason "and wow they're gonna say it was forward" in a stunned voice (despite the pass clearly being forward).

Smith is essentially the face of Fox Sports coverage of the National Rugby League competition and calls between 2-3 matches per round.
He has also called the 2010/11 KFC Twenty20 big bash league.

Smith made an appearance for ESPN as an on-site analyst for the 2016 College Football Sydney Cup for a crew back in Bristol.

In 2016, Smith shared how to prepares to commentate on rugby league games.  Speaking to The Daily Telegraph Smith said "You don't rest your voice as such, there are situations I will avoid though like the times I find myself in a pub during the footy season, it is loud and you have to raise your voice to be heard.  It is a strain on your voice you don't need.  I put a steamer on my face most days at this time of year to suck in steam, I live on lozenges and mints, I drink ridiculous amounts of water, I try to keep hydrated".

As of the start of the 2018 NRL season, Smith began co-hosting Fox League’s weekly rugby league podcast, “You can take me now I have seen it all” (named after Smith’s famous call of a last second comeback by the South Sydney Rabbitohs in 2012) along with fellow Fox League caller Matt Russell. The podcast reviewed the past weeks matches, discussed big talking points in the game and previewed upcoming games.  From the end of the season and from 2019, Lara Pitt will also be a part of the weekly fixture.

References

External links

Fox Sports Profile

Australian rugby league commentators
Living people
Year of birth missing (living people)